This is a list of flag bearers who have represented Burma and Myanmar at the Olympics.

Flag bearers carry the national flag of their country at the opening ceremony of the Olympic Games.

See also
Myanmar at the Olympics

References

Myanmar at the Olympics
Myanmar
Olympic flagbearers
Olympic flagbearers